Franz Gertsch (8 March 1930 – 21 December 2022) was a Swiss painter who was known for his large format hyperrealistic portraits.

Biography
Gertsch was born 1930 in Mörigen, Switzerland. Between 1947 and 1952 he studied with Max von Mühlenen and Hans Schwarzenbach in Bern. In 1972, he took part in the documenta 5 in Kassel with his painting "Medici". He is known for his realistic paintings and woodcuts for which he developed a new technique. From 1976 to 2013 he created a total of 28 paintings and 15 monochrome woodcuts; he worked on a single composition for up to a year. In 2002 Gertsch opened a Museum Franz Gertsch in Burgdorf. On the 8 March 2019, Frantz Gertschs birthday, the Museums expansion was inaugurated by the Federal Councilor Simonetta Sommaruga.

Gertsch died on 21 December 2022, at the age of 92 in Riggisberg in Canton Bern.

Works
Source:

Early works (1969–1976)
 Huah (1969)
 Maria mit Kindern (1971)
 Medici (1971/72)
 Gaby und Luciano (1973)
 At Luciano's House (1973)
 Barbara und Gaby (1974)
 Marina schminkt Luciano (1975)

Main works (1978–2004)
 Patti Smith I, II, V (1978/79)
 Selbstbildnis (1980)
 Johanna I (1983/84)
 Silvia I (1998)
 Gräser I (1995/96)
 Gräser IV (1998/99)

Late works
Source:

 Herbst (2007/08)
 Sommer (2008/2009)
 Winter (2009)
 Frühling (2011)

Exhibitions
Source:

Solo exhibitions
2020
"Franz Gertsch. Die Siebziger", Museum Franz Gertsch, Burgdorf, LENTOS Kunstmuseum Linz, Linz
"Franz Gertsch. Looking Back. Hommage zum Neunzigsten", Graphische Sammlung ETH Zürich, Zürich
2019
"Franz Gertsch. Es malt sich wie von selbst", Museum Franz Gertsch, Burgdorf
"Franz Gertsch. Frühling, Sommer, Herbst und Winter", Museum Franz Gertsch, Burgdorf
"Franz Gertsch. Winter und Sommer", Galerie Kornfeld, Bern
2018
"Franz Gertsch. Bilder sind meine Biografie", Kunsthalle zu Kiel, Kiel
"Franz Gertsch: Polyfocal Allover", Swiss Institute (SI), New York
"Franz Gertsch. Looking at you", Museum Franz Gertsch, Burgdorf
2017
"Franz Gertsch visages paysages", Musée Jenisch, Vevey
"Franz Gertsch", Galerie Skopia, Genf
"Franz Gertsch. Sommer", Museum Franz Gertsch, Burgdorf
"Franz Gertsch. Neu und unbekannt", Museum Franz Gertsch, Burgdorf
"Franz Gertsch. Selected monumental woodcuts", Galleri K, TEFAF Maastricht
2016
"Werke von Franz Gertsch", Museum Franz Gertsch, Burgdorf
"Franz Gertsch. Portraits and Landscapes: Woodcuts", Galleri K, Oslo
2015
"Franz Gertsch. Gewachsen", Museum Franz Gertsch, Burgdorf
"Franz Gertsch. Frühe Holzschnitte", Kabinett, Museum Franz Gertsch, Burgdorf
"Franz Gertsch. Johanna & Co. feat. Andy Warhol", Museum Franz Gertsch, Burgdorf
"Franz Gertsch", Galerie Michael Haas, Berlin
2014
"Franz Gertsch", Galerie Skopia, Genf
"Franz Gertsch", Les Abattoirs, Toulouse
"Franz Gertsch: Die Jahreszeiten", Museum Kurhaus Kleve, Kleve
"Franz Gertsch. Triptychon Guadeloupe", Museum Folkwang, Essen
2013
"Franz Gertsch Holzschnitte. Aus der Natur gerissen", Museum Sinclair-Haus, Bad Homburg
"Franz Gertsch. Geheimnis Natur", Museum Frieder Burda, Baden-Baden
2012
"Franz Gertsch. Momentaufnahme", Museum Franz Gertsch, Burgdorf
"Franz Gertsch. Die vier Jahreszeiten", Museum Franz Gertsch, Burgdorf
2011
"Franz Gertsch. Aus dem Frühwerk", museum franz gertsch, Burgdorf
"Franz Gertsch. Die vier Jahreszeiten", museum franz gertsch, Burgdorf
"Franz Gertsch. Das grosse Gras", Museum Franz Gertsch, Burgdorf
"Franz Gertsch. Jahreszeiten. Werke von 1983 bis 2011", Kunsthaus Zürich
"Franz Gertsch – Holzschnitte", Galerie Haas AG, Zürich
"Franz Gertsch – Holzschnitte- ausgewählte Separatdrucke", Galerie Kornfeld und Cie., Bern
2010
"Rot & Blau. Franz Gertsch und Max von Mühlenen", museum franz gertsch, Burgdorf
"Franz Gertsch. Drei Gemälde aus dem Vier Jahreszeiten Zyklus", museum franz gertsch, Burgdorf
2009
"Franz Gertsch. 1950 und 1960: Skizzen und Vorzeichnungen zu, Tristan Bärmann‘", museum franz gertsch, Burgdorf
"Franz Gertsch. Die neuen Jahreszeiten", museum franz gertsch, Burgdorf
"Eigenleben der Farbe. Farbproben zur Druckgraphik von Franz Gertsch", museum franz gertsch, Burgdorf
"Franz Gertsch – Gräser – Holzschnitte", Galerie Lindner, Wien
"Silvia", Galerie Haas & Fuchs, Berlin
2008
"Franz Gertsch", Galerie Skopia, Genf
"Franz Gertsch", Patrick Painter Inc., Santa Monica, CA
"Franz Gertsch. Herbst", museum franz gertsch, Burgdorf
"Franz Gertsch. Arbeiten auf Papier", museum franz gertsch, Burgdorf
"Franz Gertsch", Galerie Lovers of Fine Art, Gstaad
2007 "REHAU Aussicht Franz Gertsch", REHAU ART, Rehau
2006
"Franz Gertsch – Monumentale Holzschnitte", museum franz gertsch, Burgdorf
"Franz Gertsch. Retrospektive – das malerische Werk 1951–1986", MUMOK Museum für Moderne Kunst Stiftung
Ludwig, Wien, zusammen mit
"Franz Gertsch. Naturporträts", Albertina, Wien
"Franz Gertsch, Ikon Gallery", Birmingham
2005
"Franz Gertsch. Die Retrospektive", museum franz gertsch, Burgdorf, Kunstmuseum Bern, Ludwig Forum für Internationale Kunst, Aachen (2006), Kunsthalle Tübingen (2006)
"M+M – Der Johanna Zyklus", museum franz gertsch, Burgdorf
"Franz Gertsch – Werke aus der Sammlung Stiftung Willy Michel", museum franz gertsch, Burgdorf
"Chuck Close. Franz Gertsch", Galerie Haas & Fuchs, Berlin, galerie im park, Burgdorf
"Franz Gertsch, Aquarelle – Schottland 1961–1965" – Museum Kurhaus Kleve
"Franz Gertsch. Fang Lijun. The Languages of Nature”, White Space, Peking
2004
"Franz Gertsch – Werke aus der Sammlung Stiftung Willy Michel", museum franz gertsch, Burgdorf
"Franz Gertsch. Aquarelle – Schottland 1961–1965", Graphische Sammlung der ETH Zürich, Museum Kurhaus Kleve
"Presence", The Speed Art Museum, Louisville, Kentucky
"Franz Gertsch – Patti Smith”, Gagosian Gallery, New York
"Martin Disler. Franz Gertsch", Galerie & Edition René Steiner, Erlach
2003
"Franz Gertsch. Silvia, kestnergesellschaft, Hannover
"Franz Gertsch – Patti Smith", museum franz gertsch, Burgdorf, Pinakothek der Moderne, München
2002
"Franz Gertsch", Galerie Monica de Cardenas, Mailand
"Franz Gertsch. Das Gesamtwerk 1987–2002", Eröffnungsausstellung museum franz gertsch, Burgdorf
"Franz Gertsch. Monumentale Holzschnitte", Bündner Kunstmuseum, Chur
2001 "Franz Gertsch. Xylographies monumentales 1986–2000", Centre culturel suisse, Paris
2000
"Franz Gertsch. Holzschnitte, Gräser", Galerie Haas & Fuchs, Berlin
"Franz Gertsch”, Hess Collection at Vinopolis, London
1999
"Franz Gertsch – Gemälde und Holzschnitte 1987 bis 1997", Museum Kurhaus Kleve
"Stille Wasser. 7 Räume, 7 Künstler um Franz Gertsch", Kunstmuseum Thun
1997
"Franz Gertsch. Preisträger des Kaiserrings Goslar", Mönchehaus Museum für moderne Kunst, Goslar
"Franz Gertsch – Landschaften und Porträts 1986–1995", Hamburger Bahnhof – Museum für Gegenwart, Staatliche Museen zu Berlin
"Franz Gertsch”, Cabinet des estampes, Musée d'art et d'histoire, Genf
"Franz Gertsch. Holzschnitte”, Kunsthalle Burgdorf
1996 "Franz Gertsch", Frankfurt, MMK Museum für Moderne Kunst
1995 "Franz Gertsch”, Aichi Prefectural Museum of Art, Nagoya
1994
"Franz Gertsch. Holzschnitte 1986–1994", Staatliche Kunsthalle Baden-Baden
"Franz Gertsch. Travaux récents", Galerie Patrick Roy, Lausanne
"Franz Gertsch. Holzschnitte und Malerei auf Papier", Kunstmuseum Bern
"Franz Gertsch. Holzschnitte 1986–1994", Galerie Kornfeld & Cie., Bern
1993 "Franz Gertsch. Landschaften", Graphische Sammlung der ETH, Zürich, Städtische Galerie im Städelschen Kunstinstitut, Frankfurt a. M.
1992 "Franz Gertsch. Gravures sur bois 1986–1991", Galerie Patrick Roy, Lausanne
1991
"Franz Gertsch, Eröffnungsausstellung", Galerie Rigassi, Bern
"Franz Gertsch. Holzschnitte", Städtische Galerie im Lenbachhaus, München
"Franz Gertsch. Nine Large Scale Woodcuts”, Hirshhorn Museum and Sculpture Garden, Washington, D.C., San José Museum of Art
1990 "Franz Gertsch. Large Scale Woodcuts”, Serie "Projects", Museum of Modern Art, New York
1989 "Franz Gertsch. Bois gravés monumentaux. Grossformatige Holzschnitte. Large-scale woodcuts”, Cabinet des estampes und Musée Rath, Musée d’art et d’histoire, Genf
1986
"Franz Gertsch", Museum Moderner Kunst, Wien, Kunsthalle Basel
"Franz Gertsch. Johanna II", Kunsthalle Bern
1983 "Franz Gertsch, Arbeiten 1981/82/83", Knoedler, Zürich
1981/82 "Franz Gertsch. Major Works”, Louis K. Meisel Gallery, New York
1980 "Franz Gertsch", Kunsthaus Zürich, Sprengelmuseum Hannover
1979 "Franz Gertsch", Galerie Veith Turske, Köln
1976 "Franz Gertsch", Galerie Veith Turske, Köln
1975 "Franz Gertsch", Akademie der Künste, Berlin, Kunstverein Braunschweig, Kunsthalle Düsseldorf, Kunsthalle Basel
1973 "Franz Gertsch", Nancy Hoffmann Gallery, New York
1972
"Franz Gertsch", Galerie Mikro, Berlin
"Franz Gertsch", Kunstmuseum Luzern
1971 "Franz Gertsch", Galerie Verna, Zürich
1970
Galerie Stampa, Basel
"Franz Gertsch – Neue Bilder II", Galerie Toni Gerber, Bern
"Franz Gertsch – Neue Bilder I", Galerie Toni Gerber, Bern
1969 "Franz Gertsch – Bilder und Collagen", Galerie Riehentor, Basel
1968 "Franz Gertsch. Bilder und Collagen 1968", Galerie Krebs, Bern
1966 "Franz Gertsch", Orell Füssli, Zürich
1965 "Franz Gertsch. Aquarelle", Galerie Bertram, Burgdorf
1964 "Franz Gertsch", Anlikerkeller, Bern
1962 "Franz Gertsch", Anlikerkeller, Bern
1955 "Franz Gertsch. Malerei, Graphik", Anlikerkeller, Bern
1951 "Franz Gertsch", Galerie Simmen, Bern

Scholarships and awards
 1949 De Harris scholarship
 1967 Louise Aeschlimann scholarship
 1974–75 DAAD scholarship, Berlin
 1997 Goslarer Kaiserring
 1998 Kulturpreis der Bürgi-Willert-Foundation
 2005 Honorary citizen Christian-Albrechts-Universität, Kiel
 2006 Honorary citizen Rüschegg

See also
Museum Franz Gertsch

References

Further reading

External links
 
 

1930 births
2022 deaths
Swiss male painters
Swiss contemporary artists
20th-century Swiss painters
21st-century Swiss painters
21st-century Swiss male artists
People from Biel/Bienne District
Photorealist artists
20th-century Swiss male artists